Spodoptera albula (unbarred spodoptera moth or gray-streaked armyworm moth) is a moth of the  family Noctuidae found from the southern United States, south to South America.

The wingspan is 33–35 mm. The forewings are brownish-grey with dark streaks along the veins. There is a thin black basal dash and a reniform spot in the form of a small dark dot. The hindwings are white with pale grey shading and a dotted black terminal line. Adults are on wing in the final half of the year, peaking in November.

The larvae feed on Amaranthus species.

References

albula
Moths of North America
Moths of the Caribbean
Moths of Central America
Moths of South America
Moths of Cuba
Lepidoptera of Jamaica
Moths described in 1857